George Carlin’s American Dream is a 2022 two-part documentary film about comedian George Carlin directed by Judd Apatow and Michael Bonfiglio.

Summary

Part 1
At the dawn of the 1960s comedy scene, a clean-cut Carlin works the mainstream variety-show circuit but soon realizes that he was meant for something edgier. He trades his suit and tie for bluejeans, and finds that his eloquence and sometimes brutal candor resonate with counterculture audiences. Propelled by sales of his four gold comedy records released on Flip Wilson's Little David label (Little David Records), appearances on talk shows, and frequent touring, Carlin becomes a major comedic force of the 1970s.

Part 2
In the 1980s, Carlin faces major challenges: His audiences are shrinking, some critics deem him passé, and his family is suffering because of his cocaine use and his wife's alcoholism. He approaches his material with a new vigor, and fills comedy clubs and large venues with his insightful and increasingly critical observations about politics, life, and human behavior.

Production
On August 10, 2020, HBO announced that a documentary about George Carlin was in development with Judd Apatow and his longtime collaborator Michael Bongfiglio. They were also working with editor  Joe Beshenkovsky, who worked with Apatow on the documentary The Zen Diaries of Garry Shandling. The film is dedicated in the memory of Patrick Carlin Jr., George's elder brother, who died a month before the film was released.

Notable interviewees
George Carlin (archival footage)
Brenda Carlin, Carlin's first wife (archival footage)
Sally Wade, Carlin's second wife
Kelly Carlin, Carlin's daughter
Patrick Carlin Jr., Carlin's elder brother
Kliph Nesteroff, author and comedy historian
Jerry Hamza, Carlin's manager from 1980 until his death
Bette Midler
Rocco Urbisci, executive producer of Carlin's HBO specials from Playin' with Your Head onward
Alex Winter, co-star of the Bill & Ted films
Tony Orlando, host of the variety show Tony Orlando and Dawn
Kevin Smith, director of Dogma and Jersey Girl, which featured Carlin
Comedians who have cited Carlin as an inspiration, including:
Bill Burr
Stephen Colbert
Sam Jay
Chris Rock
Patton Oswalt
W. Kamau Bell
Jerry Seinfeld
Hasan Minhaj
Paul Reiser
Jon Stewart
Steven Wright

Awards and nominations

References

External links

2022 documentary films
2022 American television series debuts
2022 American television series endings
HBO documentary films
HBO Max films
Films produced by Judd Apatow
Documentary films about comedy and comedians
Primetime Emmy Award-winning broadcasts
American Dream